NWRA may refer to:
National Waste & Recycling Association
National Wildlife Refuge Association
 National Women's Rowing Association; see Association for Intercollegiate Athletics for Women championships
North West Racing Association, a snocross association in Canada
North West Regional Assembly
 Northern and Western Regional Assembly; see Western Railway Corridor